The Cold Still is the third album from the UK band The Boxer Rebellion; it was released 7 February 2011 in the UK and Europe. The album was released exclusively on iTunes on 1 February 2011. The Cold Still was produced and mixed by Ethan Johns, engineered by Dom Monks, and managed by Embargo Management.

The band performed "Step Out of the Car" on the Late Show with David Letterman on 2 February 2011.

Reception 
Stereoboard described the album as the start of "a bright future" for the band, taking inspiration from recent "popular music habits" leading to a diverse range of songs which "are near flawless in their own way".

Track listing

Charts

References

2011 albums
The Boxer Rebellion (band) albums
Albums produced by Ethan Johns